Jerzy Stanisław Dziadkowiec (born 7 May 1949 in Dytmarów) is a Polish sprint canoer who competed in the early 1970s. He was eliminated in the semifinals of the K-4 1000 m event at the 1972 Summer Olympics in Munich.

References
 Sports-reference.com profile

1949 births
Canoeists at the 1972 Summer Olympics
Living people
Olympic canoeists of Poland
Polish male canoeists
People from Prudnik County
Sportspeople from Opole Voivodeship
20th-century Polish people